Mirwais Ashraf Khan  (born June 30, 1988) is a right-handed batsman and right-arm fast-medium bowler who plays for the Afghanistan national cricket team and Chairman of Afghanistan Cricket Board since 6 November 2021.

Career
Ashraf made his One Day International (ODI) debut against the Netherlands at the VRA Cricket Ground on 30 August 2009. Ashraf also made his first-class cricket debut against the same opponents in Afghanistan's debut match in the Intercontinental Cup, where in the Netherlands' second innings he took four wickets for 24 runs to help set up an historic Afghan win by one wicket.

In September 2019, he was the leading wicket-taker in the 2019 Ghazi Amanullah Khan Regional One Day Tournament, with 16 dismissals in six matches.

References

External links
Mirwais Ashraf on Cricinfo

1988 births
Living people
Afghan cricketers
Pashtun people
Afghanistan One Day International cricketers
Afghanistan Twenty20 International cricketers
Asian Games medalists in cricket
Cricketers at the 2010 Asian Games
Cricketers at the 2015 Cricket World Cup
Band-e-Amir Dragons cricketers
Asian Games silver medalists for Afghanistan
Medalists at the 2010 Asian Games
Sportspeople from Kunduz
Balkh Legends cricketers
Afghanistan Cricket Board Chairmen